Dice is a general purpose, object-oriented programming language. The principal is simplicity, pulling many themes of the language from Java. Dice is a high level language that utilizes LLVM IR to abstract away hardware implementation of code. Utilizing the LLVM as a backend allows for automatic garbage collection of variables as well. Dice is a strongly typed programming language, meaning that at compile time the language will be type-checked, thus preventing runtime errors of type.

Types
There are two kinds of types in the Dice programming language: primitive types and non-primitive types. There are, correspondingly, two kinds of data values that can be stored in variables, passed as arguments, returned by methods, and operated on: primitive values and non-primitive values.

There is also a special null type, the type of the expression null, which has no name. Because the null type has no name, it is impossible to declare a variable of the null type. The null reference is the only possible value of an expression of null type. The null reference can always undergo a widening reference conversion to any reference type. In practice, the programmer can ignore the null type and just pretend that null is merely a special literal that can be of any reference type.

References

http://www.cs.columbia.edu/~sedwards/classes/2015/4115-fall/index.html
http://www.cs.columbia.edu/~sedwards/classes/2015/4115-fall/proposals/Dice.pdf
http://www.cs.columbia.edu/~sedwards/classes/2015/4115-fall/lrms/Dice.pdf

Object-oriented programming languages